Sylviane Felix (born 31 October 1977 in Créteil, France) is a track and field sprint athlete, competing internationally for France, who won the bronze medal in the 4 × 100 m relay at the 2004 Olympic Games in Athens, Greece.

Felix started running at age fifteen. She suffered knee and back injuries which forced her out of competition for two years between 1998 and 2000. She did not know anything about athletics and was not particularly interested in it but she won her first race. "The sensations were extraordinary so I continued with it." Her best senior solo result was finishing 4th in the 200m final at the 2002 European Athletics Championships in Munich.

Felix was the 1996 world junior 200m champion. Her occupation is police officer. She is a graduated sociologist. She finished 5th in the 200m final and 7th in the 100m final at the 2006 European Athletics Championships in Gothenburg.

Personal Bests 

 100m: 11.15 s
 200m: 22.56 s
 French Record Holder in 4 × 100m Relay in 2003, time: 41.78 s

External links

1977 births
Living people
Sportspeople from Créteil
French female sprinters
Athletes (track and field) at the 2004 Summer Olympics
Olympic athletes of France
Olympic bronze medalists for France
French people of Martiniquais descent
World Athletics Championships medalists
European Athletics Championships medalists
Medalists at the 2004 Summer Olympics
French police officers
Olympic bronze medalists in athletics (track and field)
Mediterranean Games gold medalists for France
Mediterranean Games silver medalists for France
Mediterranean Games bronze medalists for France
Athletes (track and field) at the 1997 Mediterranean Games
Athletes (track and field) at the 2001 Mediterranean Games
Athletes (track and field) at the 2005 Mediterranean Games
Mediterranean Games medalists in athletics
World Athletics Championships winners
Olympic female sprinters